The  was held on 5 February 2017 in Yokohama, Kanagawa, Japan.

Awards
 Best Film: - In This Corner of the World 
 Best Director: Ryōta Nakano - Her Love Boils Bathwater
 Yoshimitsu Morita Memorial Best New Director:
Tetsuya Mariko - Destruction Babies
Yasukazu Sugiyama - Something Like, Something Like It
 Best Screenplay: Ryōta Nakano - Her Love Boils Bathwater
 Best Cinematographer: Yasuyuki Sasaki - Destruction Babies
 Best Actor:
 Tomokazu Miura - Katsuragi Case
 Yūya Yagira - Destruction Babies
 Best Actress: Mariko Tsutsui - Harmonium
 Best Supporting Actor: Masaki Suda - Destruction Babies
 Best Supporting Actress: Hana Sugisaki - Her Love Boils Bathwater
 Best Newcomer:
 Taiga - Harmonium
 Nana Komatsu - Destruction Babies
 Nijirō Murakami - Destruction Babies
 Examiner Special Award: Non - In This Corner of the World
 Special Grand Prize: Hideaki Anno - Shin Godzilla

Top 10
 In This Corner of the World
 Her Love Boils Bathwater
 Destruction Babies
 Shin Godzilla
 The Long Excuse
 Harmonium
 Rage
 Satoshi: A Move for Tomorrow
 Katsuragi Case
 Your Name
runner-up. A Bride for Rip Van Winkle

References

Yokohama Film Festival
Yokohama Film Festival
2017 in Japanese cinema
2017 festivals in Asia